The Bahman-nameh is a Persian epic poem of around 9500 lines, which describes the exploits of Kay Bahman, the son of Esfandiyar of the royal Kayanid dynasty. The earliest attestation of this work is in the book Mojmal al-tawarikh, which gives the author as Iranshan ibn Abi'-Khayr (Iranshah).

Iranshah most likely wrote the Bahman-nama between 1092–1108, as indicated by mentions of historical events, and mentions of the Seljuk sultans Mahmud I and Muhammad I Tapar. Iranshah states that the Bahman-nama was inspired by the ceaseless battles and wars of his patron, Muhammad I Tapar, which reminded him of the ceaseless battles between Bahman and Rostam's family. This implies that the work was also written to serve as advice for solving the socio-political issues of the time.

References

Sources
 
 

Persian mythology
Persian poems
Epic poems in Persian